"Love Comes" is a song recorded by British girl group Bananarama. It was released on 6 September 2009 as the lead single from their tenth studio album Viva.

Song information
"Love Comes" was released on 6 September 2009 as digital download single and 7 September 2009 in physical vinyl and CD format as the first single from the duo's album Viva. The song was written by Bananarama members Sara Dallin and Keren Woodward and producer Ian Masterson. The b-side for the CD single is a new version of their 1983 hit "Cruel Summer", while the b-side tracks for the vinyl editions are cover versions.

The song is the first single in the group's career where the members performed solo sections rather than harmonising as a group.

The nine-track remix promo CD single was released in July 2009.

The single peaked on the UK Singles Chart at number 44.

Music video
A music video for "Love Comes" was shot in London on 1 July 2009. The video features Dallin and Woodward in various retro outfits, and has both outdoor and studio settings. The theme of the video is a reflection on various fashion magazines and trends, with each scene intended to be a different 'glamour shot'. The song lyrics are projected onto backgrounds, and onto the girls themselves in most of the scenes.

Formats
Love Comes was released in several formats including various digital bundles.

7-inch picture disc featuring Keren
"Love Comes" (radio edit)
"Voyage Voyage" (D. A. Dubois/J. M. Rivat) 
7-inch picture disc featuring Sara
"Love Comes" (radio edit)
"Tokyo Joe"  (B. Ferry) 
CD Single
"Love Comes" (radio edit)
"Cruel Summer '09"
Download
"Love Comes" (album version)
"Love Comes" (Ian Masterson's 12-inch Extended mix)
Remixed by Ian Masterson
iTunes Exclusive Remix Bundle
"Love Comes" (Radio Edit)
Remixed by Ian Masterson
"Love Comes" (Riff & Rays Club Mix)
"Love Comes" (Wideboys Club Mix)
Remixed by Jim Sullivan & Eddie Craig
All Other BPs Remix Bundle (Amazon MP3, 7 Digital, etc.)
"Love Comes" (Radio Edit)
Remixed by Ian Masterson
"Love Comes" (Riff & Rays Radio Edit)
"Love Comes" (Wideboys Radio Edit)
Remixed by Jim Sullivan & Eddie Craig
Alternate Version (Amazon MP3, 7 Digital, etc.)
"Love Comes" (Alternate Version) or (Wideboys A Mix)
Remixed by Jim Sullivan & Eddie Craig
Promo Remixes
"Love Comes" (Wideboys club mix)
Remixed by Jim Sullivan & Eddie Craig
"Love Comes" (Riff & Rays club mix)
"Love Comes" (Ian Masterson's extended mix)
Remixed by Ian Masterson
"Love Comes" (Wideboys dub)
Remixed by Jim Sullivan & Eddie Craig
"Love Comes" (Riff & Rays radio edit)
"Love Comes" (Wideboys club edit)
"Love Comes" (Wideboys A mix)
Remixed by Jim Sullivan & Eddie Craig
"Love Comes" (Radio edit)
"Love Comes" (Album version)

Charts

Notes
"Voyage Voyage" was originally performed by Desireless.
"Tokyo Joe" was originally performed by Bryan Ferry.

References

2009 singles
Bananarama songs
Songs written by Sara Dallin
Songs written by Keren Woodward
Songs written by Ian Masterson
Song recordings produced by Ian Masterson
Fascination Records singles